Charlotte of Württemberg may refer to:

Charlotte, Princess Royal (1766–1828), queen of Württemberg
Princess Charlotte of Württemberg (1807–1873), known as  Elena Pavlovna
Charlotte of Schaumburg-Lippe (1864–1946), queen of Württemberg